Eosinophilic vasculitis is a cutaneous condition characterized by an inflammation of blood vessels and the presence of eosinophils.

See also 
 Itchy red bump disease
 List of cutaneous conditions

References 

Eosinophilic cutaneous conditions